Gvardeyskoye is an airbase of the Russian Air Force in Hvardiiske, Simferopol Raion, Crimea, Ukraine.

The history of flying here began in the 1930s when Polikarpov Po-2s were flown. 

The base is home to the 37th Guards Composite Aviation Regiment which flies the Sukhoi Su-24M (ASCC: Fencer) and the Sukhoi Su-25SM/25UB (ASCC: Frogfoot under the 27th Composite Aviation Division as part of the 4th Air and Air Defence Forces Army, Southern Military District.

The base was home to the 43rd Independent Maritime Assault Aviation Regiment from 1990.

References

Airports in Crimea
Military facilities in Crimea
Russian Air Force bases
Military installations established in the 1930s
Ukrainian airbases